S. Nambi Narayanan (born 12 December 1941) is an Indian aerospace scientist who worked for the Indian Space Research Organisation (ISRO) and contributed significantly to the Indian space program by developing the Vikas rocket engine. He led the team which acquired technology from the French for the Vikas engine used in the first Polar Satellite Launch Vehicle (PSLV) that India launched. As a senior official at the ISRO, he was in charge of the cryogenics division. He was awarded the Padma Bhushan, India's third-highest civilian award, in March 2019.

In 1994, he was arrested on trumped up charges of espionage, being subjected to physical abuse while in the custody of the Kerala Police. The charges against him were found to be baseless by the Central Bureau of Investigation (CBI) in April 1996. As a result, the Supreme Court of India dismissed all charges against him and prohibited the Government of Kerala from continuing its investigation on technical grounds. The film Rocketry: The Nambi Effect, based on his life, starring and directed by R. Madhavan, was released in July 2022.

Early and personal life 
Nambi Narayanan was born on 12 December 1941 in the house of Tamil Hindu parents in Nagercoil, in the erstwhile Princely state of Travancore (present-day Kanyakumari District). He completed his schooling at Higher Secondary School, Nagercoil. He received a Bachelor of Technology in Mechanical Engineering from Thiagarajar College of Engineering, Madurai. Narayanan lost his father while pursuing his degree in Madurai, with his mother falling sick soon after. He had two sisters. Nambi married Meena Narayanan and has two children. Their son, Shankar Nambi, is a businessman. Their daughter Geetha Arunan is a Montessori school teacher in Bangalore and is married to Subbiah Arunan, an ISRO scientist, director of the Mars Orbiter Mission and Padma Shri awardee.

Career
After studying mechanical engineering in Madurai, Narayanan started his career in 1966 at ISRO as a technical assistant at the Thumba Equatorial Rocket Launching Station. He was sent to Princeton University on deputation at Indian Government expense in 1969. He completed his master's program there in chemical rocket propulsion under professor Luigi Crocco. He returned to India with expertise in liquid propulsion at a time when Indian rocketry was still solely dependent on solid propellants. He has claimed that he had to educate Sarabhai on liquid propulsion technology in his book.

In 1974, Societe Europeenne de Propulsion agreed to transfer the Viking engine technology in return for 100 man-years of engineering work from ISRO. This transfer was completed by three teams and Narayanan led the team of fifty-two engineers who worked on technology acquisition from French. The other two teams worked on indigenizing the hardware in India and establishing the development facilities in Mahendragiri. The first engine, named Vikas, was tested successfully in 1985.  An enquiry by the vigilance cell in 1982 was dropped later. R. B. Sreekumar, in his capacity as the commandant of the Central Industrial Security Force unit posted at the Vikram Sarabhai Space Centre, had investigated an allegation of financial manipulation by Narayanan. In 1994, he submitted a request of voluntary resignation a month before his arrest by Kerala police. 

On 26 January 2019, he was conferred with the Padma Bhushan award by the Government of India for developing the Vikas rocket engine.

False espionage charges 

On 30 November 1994, Narayanan was arrested as part of an investigation of alleged espionage, by a team of Kerala police and Intelligence Bureau officials, based on the videographed statements by a colleague that he and Narayanan had received money for transferring drawings and documents of rocket engines to two Maldivian women, Mariam Rasheeda and Fauziyya Hassan, who were suspected to be spies. In December 1994, the transfer of the case to the Central Bureau of Investigation (CBI) was criticized in media and by opposition parties in Kerala. CBI was seen to be dominated by P. V. Narasimha Rao, then-Prime Minister of India and some of the people named in the investigation were close to Rao and K. Karunakaran, then-Chief Minister of Kerala.

Narayanan spent 50 days in jail. He claims that officials from the Intelligence Bureau, who initially interrogated him, wanted him to make false accusations against the top brass of ISRO. He alleges that two IB officials had asked him to implicate A. E. Muthunayagam, his boss and then-director of the Liquid Propulsion Systems Centre (LPSC), saying that when he refused to comply, he was tortured until he collapsed and was hospitalised. He says his main complaint against ISRO is that it did not support him. K. Kasturirangan, who was ISRO chairman at the time, stated that ISRO could not interfere in a legal matter. He has written that the director of CBI Vijaya Rama Rao met him in jail on 8 December (four days after the case was transferred), when he explained to the director that the drawings of rockets and engines were not classified and has expressed that the CBI director wondered how the case had gotten so far and apologized in that meeting.

In April 1996, before the 1996 Indian general election, CBI submitted a closure report, saying that there was no espionage and that the testimonies of suspects were coerced by torture. In a previous order in a related case, Kerala High Court, which had seen the videos of interrogation, had dismissed allegations of torture and made critical comments about CBI's failure to follow all the leads. Amid attention on gaps in the CBI closure report, a challenge of the report in Kerala High Court by S. Vijayan, a police officer and continuing political pressure, the Kerala government revoked the permission granted previously to CBI to investigate the case and ordered the Kerala police to take it up again. But a Supreme Court bench stopped it in April 1998 saying that "the CBI found that no case had been made out" and ordered the Kerala government to pay  to each of the accused (including Narayanan). In September 1999, the National Human Rights Commission (NHRC) passed strictures against the government of Kerala for having damaged Narayanan's distinguished career in space research along with the physical and mental torture to which he and his family were subjected. After the dismissal of charges against them, the two scientists, Sasikumar and Narayanan were transferred out of Thiruvananthapuram and were given desk jobs.

He retired in 2001.

After a meeting between Narendra Modi and Narayanan in Thiruvananthapuram, the Bharatiya Janata Party (BJP) took up the case and Narayanan's treatment, especially by Sreekumar, in its campaign for 2014 Indian general election.

On 14 September 2018, the Supreme Court appointed a panel to probe the "harrowing" arrest and alleged torture of Narayanan. A three-judge bench led by Chief Justice Dipak Misra also awarded Narayanan  in compensation for the "mental cruelty" he suffered all these years. The same month, Narayanan's name was recommended for Padma awards by Rajeev Chandrasekhar, then a BJP member of parliament. In January 2019, Modi said that "it was an honour for his government to confer the Padma Bhushan on Nambi Narayanan". The case and the Padma award featured in BJP's campaign for 2019 Indian general election, with Modi asking "I hope you are aware what the Congress has done to Kerala's own scientist Nambi Narayan" in a rally in Thiruvananthapuram.

Recent developments 

On 14 Apr 2021 the Supreme Court of India ordered a CBI probe into the involvement of police officers in the conspiracy. Several of the involved police officers filed petitions in different courts in Kerala in which several documents showing transfer of lands between 2004 and 2008 by Narayanan to various CBI officers involved in the investigation, were produced. The Kerala High Court dismissed one of the pleas to investigate the land deals. It said that the documents were insufficient proof, but allowed the petitioners to file a fresh case with better sale records.

Awards
 March 2019: Padma Bhushan, India's third-highest civilian award.

In popular culture

Books
 Ormakalude Bhramanapadham: An Autobiography by Nambi Narayanan, Prajesh Sen; Thrissur Current Books, 2017.
 Ready To Fire: How India and I Survived the ISRO Spy Case by Nambi Narayanan, Arun Ram; Bloomsbury India, 2018.

Filmography 
 In December 2012, he acted as a professor in a documentary, Mizhineerkayal, about the Alleppey-Kuttanad backwaters.

 In July 2022, a biographical film was made titled Rocketry: The Nambi Effect, written, directed by R. Madhavan, who also played the titular role of Narayanan.

References

External links
 Most detail of false ISRO Spy case.
 National Interest: The ISRO Spy Case Test- Sekar Gupta
 How India's cryogenic programme was wrecked

1941 births
Indian Space Research Organisation people
Living people
Indian aerospace engineers
20th-century Indian engineers
Indian chemical engineers
People from Kanyakumari district
Scientists from Kerala
Recipients of the Padma Bhushan in science & engineering
Prisoners and detainees of India